The Australian National Imams Council (ANIC) was formed in 2006 during a meeting of more than 80 Sunni imams which had gathered to discuss the crisis created by comments made by Taj El-Din Hilaly. In 2011, they requested that the Darulfatwa-supported Muslim Community Radio Incorporated not have its licence renewed due to ties with Al-Ahbash and because of its promotion of "sectarian fringe views".

The Australian National Imams Council (ANIC) is the peak Muslim body that represents imams and Muslims in Australia, with over 200 member imams from all states and territories and major Australian cities. 

The ANIC elects the Grand Mufti of Australia. The current Grand Mufti is Dr. Ibrahim Abu Mohamed.

In 2014, the ANIC expressed concerns regarding a bill in the Australian parliament that would broaden the offence of advocating terrorism. ANIC argued that the legislation would have chilling effects on free speech. It also said that any religious community referring to violent passages in the Qur'an or Bible could face sanction under this law. Other Australian Muslim groups, including the Islamic Council of Victoria and Muslim Legal Network, also expressed concerns regarding the legislation.

In February 2015 the Grand Mufti said the Australian Government should not ban Hizb ut-Tahrir, saying the group is "actually pro-freedom of speech".  The Prime Minister responded by saying the comments were "unhelpful".

In 2016, Sheikh Shady Alsuleiman was elected president of ANIC. and then re-elected for a second term in 2019. 

ANIC executive committee consists of 20 imams elected from different states.

See also
Darulfatwa - Islamic High Council of Australia
Grand Mufti of Australia
Islam in Australia
Islamic organisations in Australia
Islamic schools and branches

References

External links
ANIC website

2006 establishments in Australia
Organizations established in 2006
Islamism in Australia
Sunni Islamist groups